Melinda McGraw (born October 25, 1968) is an American actress. She has starred in movies such as The Dark Knight (2008), Wrongfully Accused (1998), and Skateland (2010), and is also known for her television performances on Mad Men, Men of a Certain Age, X-Files, The West Wing, and NCIS.

Early life
McGraw was born in Nicosia, Cyprus, to American parents.

The youngest of three daughters, she grew up in Cambridge and Dover in the Boston area. Her father served as a diplomat for the Agency of International Development before becoming an executive with a major hotel in Boston. She attended the Buckingham Browne & Nichols School in Cambridge and got her start in acting with the Boston Children's Theater.

After attending Bennington College, McGraw was accepted to the Royal Academy of Dramatic Art in London (one of only seven women admitted in her year). Theatrical performances in the West End and elsewhere in Britain followed, among them Don Carlos, The Foreigner and Twelfth Night. She returned to the U.S. in 1990.

Career
McGraw's first major on-screen role was as Detective Cydavia "Cyd" Madison on The Commish (1992–1994). While on the set, she met actor Nicholas Lea and the pair dated for a few years. McGraw later earned recognition for her role as Melissa Scully, Dana Scully's ill-fated sister, in four episodes of The X-Files ("One Breath", "The Blessing Way", "Paper Clip", and "Christmas Carol"). Coincidentally, Alex Krycek, the recurring antagonist responsible for Melissa's death, was played by Nicholas Lea.

McGraw has starred in The Pursuit of Happiness (1995), Soul Man (1997–1998), Living in Captivity (1998), Wednesday 9:30 (8:30 Central) (2002), and Center of the Universe (2004). Notable guest appearances include Quantum Leap, Night Court, Seinfeld, Cybill, The Larry Sanders Show, Mad About You, The District, The Practice, and Inconceivable. She has been featured in four episodes of Desperate Housewives as Annabel Foster and was cast in Neighbors, an ABC pilot for 2005-06 that was not picked up.

In 2006, McGraw played Jane Braun, campaign advisor to Presidential candidate Arnold Vinick, in several episodes of The West Wing and appeared in an episode of Bones. She played U.S. Attorney Valerie Por in Close to Home and Hartley Green in Saving Grace in 2007, as well as Annette Barron in two episodes of Journeyman.

McGraw appeared in 2008's The Dark Knight (the sequel to Batman Begins) as Lieutenant Gordon's wife, Barbara. She guest-starred in the Law & Order: SVU episode "Crush" as Samantha Copeland. She had a recurring role as seductive adulteress Bobbie Barrett in the second season of AMC's Mad Men. McGraw co-starred with Kelsey Grammer on the ABC sitcom Hank before its cancellation on November 11, 2009. She enjoyed a recurring role as Erin, Scott Bakula's love interest, on the TNT original series Men of a Certain Age in 2010–11. In 2011 and 2012, she made guest appearances in the 9th season of NCIS in the episodes "Devil's Triangle", "Devil's Trifecta" and "Devil's Triad" as Diane Sterling, an ex-wife of both Leroy Jethro Gibbs and Tobias Fornell. In season 12 of the series, her character's arc was closed when she was murdered in the episode "Check". McGraw appeared again as Diane in 2019, but as a ghost in the episode “Daughters” (season 16). In 2013 she appeared in ABC series Scandal.

Personal life
McGraw is married to composer/recording artist Steve Pierson, and they have a daughter Lucy. They all belong to Pierson's band Jambo, which performs roots music for children.

Filmography

Film

Television

References

External links
 
 

Living people
20th-century American actresses
21st-century American actresses
Actresses from Cambridge, Massachusetts
Alumni of RADA
American film actresses
American television actresses
People from Dover, Massachusetts
Buckingham Browne & Nichols School alumni
1968 births